Ashok K. Chandra (30 July 1948 – 15 November 2014) was a computer scientist at Microsoft Research in Mountain View, California, United States, where he was a general manager at the Internet Services Research Center. Chandra received his PhD in Computer Science from Stanford University, an MS from University of California, Berkeley, and a BTech from IIT Kanpur.
He was previously Director of Database and Distributed Systems at IBM Almaden Research Center.

Chandra co-authored several key papers in theoretical computer science.  Among other contributions, he introduced alternating Turing machines in computational complexity (with Dexter Kozen and Larry Stockmeyer), conjunctive queries in databases (with Philip M. Merlin), computable queries (with David Harel), and multiparty communication complexity (with Merrick L. Furst and Richard J. Lipton).

He was a founder of the annual IEEE Symposium on Logic in Computer Science and served as conference chair of the first three conferences, in 1986–8.
He was an IEEE Fellow.

References

External links 
 
 

IIT Kanpur alumni
Stanford University alumni
University of California, Berkeley alumni
Microsoft Research people
Microsoft employees
IBM employees
Fellow Members of the IEEE
1948 births
2014 deaths